is a Japanese manga artist. She made her debut in 2002 with Get Love!!, which was serialized in Shōjo Comic.

Bibliography 
 (2003) 
 A one book finished.

 (2003) 
 (2004) 
 (2005) 
 Oneshot of "Ōkami Nanka Kowaikunai!?"
 (2006) 
 Cuidado con la luna llena (Beware the Full Moon)
 (2006) 
 (2007) 
 (2008) 
 (2009) 
A compilation story with other 7 manga creators.
 (2011) 
A compilation story with other 6 manga creators.
 (2012) 
 (2013) 
A compilation story with other 6 manga creators.

 (2016) 
 (2017) 
 (2018)

References

External links 
Ikeyamada's blog 

 Go Ikeyamada manga at Media Arts Database 

Year of birth missing (living people)
Living people
Japanese female comics artists
Women manga artists
Female comics writers
People from Sendai
21st-century Japanese women writers
21st-century Japanese writers
Manga artists from Miyagi Prefecture
Writers from Miyagi Prefecture